Gleason is an unincorporated community in Lincoln County, Wisconsin, United States. Gleason is situated on Wisconsin Highway 17 northeast of Merrill, in the town of Russell. Gleason has a post office with ZIP code 54435.

The Estonian Evangelical Martin Luther Church, the first Estonian church built in America, is located in Gleason.

Gleason is known as the “Trout Fishing Capital of the World” boasting the world record brook trout and great trout fishing on many of the local streams.

Media 
Several films have been shot in Gleason, including The Giant Spider Invasion (1975), The Capture of Bigfoot (1979), The Devonsville Terror (1983), The Demons of Ludlow (1983), Blood Harvest (1987), and Twister's Revenge! (1987); many of these films are directed by Bill Rebane. Gleason was the home of Shooting Ranch Motion Picture Studios for about 30 years, until it closed in 1988.

References

Unincorporated communities in Lincoln County, Wisconsin
Unincorporated communities in Wisconsin